FC Red Star Zürich is a football club from Zürich, Switzerland; the club was founded in 1905, and is currently playing in the 1. Liga.

Players

Managers

Presidents

External links
 Official site

Football clubs in Switzerland
Association football clubs established in 1905
Sport in Zürich
1905 establishments in Switzerland